Jean-Michel Cadiot (23 December 1952 – 1 June 2020) was a French writer and journalist.

Biography
Jean-Michel was the son of Robert Cadiot (1909–1967), a polytechnician, and Odile Gay (born 1919), a Greek and Latin professor.

Cadiot held a license in Chinese from Paris Diderot University. He also took courses in economics and theology. He began working for Témoignage chrétien and the magazine France-Pays arabes. In 1979, he became a correspondent with the Agence France-Presse (AFP) in Baghdad. He joined the AFP in Paris in 1981 and worked in Rennes, Brest, Tehran, and Bucharest. He was Vice-President of the Association for Mutual Aid to Eastern Minorities.

In the 2007 French legislative election, Cadiot ran for Deputy under the UDF-MoDem ticket in Val-d'Oise's 8th constituency. However, he only obtained 3.32% of the votes in the first round. In 2008, he ran in the Canton of Sarcelles-Nord-Est, earning 3.48% of the vote.

Jean-Michel Cadiot died on 1 June 2020 at the age of 67.

Bibliography
Quand l'Irak entra en guerre (1989)
Mitterrand et les communistes (1995)
L'Almanach politique et religieux (1999)
Francisque Gay et les démocrates d'inspiration chrétienne (2006)
Les Chrétiens d'Orient. Vitalité, souffrance, avenir (2010)
Saâd Abssi, le combat pour la dignité (2014)
Noun, chrétiens de Mossoul persécutés (2014)
Pierre Santini, le but c'est le chemin (2015)

References

French journalists
1952 births
2020 deaths